Justine Henin-Hardenne was the defending champion, but did not compete this year.

Alicia Molik won the title by defeating Samantha Stosur 6–7(5–7), 6–4, 7–5 in the final. It was the 1st title for Molik in this season and the 5th title in her career.

Seeds
The first four seeds received a bye into the second round.

Draw

Finals

Top half

Bottom half

External links
 WTA tournament draws

Medibank
2005 Medibank International